McIsaac is a surname. Notable people with the surname include:

Alan McIsaac (born 1954), Canadian politician
Angus McIsaac (1842–1902), Canadian politician
Billy McIsaac (born 1949), Scottish musician
Cliff McIsaac (1930–2006), Canadian politician
Colin Francis McIsaac (1854–1927), Canadian politician
Hazel McIsaac (1933–2012), Canadian politician
Hilary McIsaac (1820–1901), Canadian politician
James McIsaac (1854–1927), Canadian politician
John L. McIsaac (1870–1941), Canadian politician
Justin McIsaac (born 1978), American wrestler
Shona McIsaac (born 1960), Scottish politician
Tai McIsaac (born 1975), Australian rugby union player